Peacock is an American over-the-top video streaming service owned and operated by the Television and Streaming division of NBCUniversal, a subsidiary of Comcast. Named after the NBC logo, the service launched on July 15, 2020. The service primarily features series and film content from NBCUniversal studios and other third-party content providers, including television series, films, news, and sports programming. The service is available in a free ad-supported version with limited content, while premium tiers include a larger content library and access to additional NBC Sports, Hallmark Channel, and WWE content.

As of December 2022, the service has reached 20 million paid subscribers. Peacock TV has also launched its official app which is available on Google Play, Apple Store and Amazon App Store.

History
On January 14, 2019, NBCUniversal announced plans to launch an over-the-top streaming service in 2020, which would feature original and library content, and be available in free advertising-supported and paid ad-free versions. The service would be led by  chairman Bonnie Hammer, under the division NBCUniversal Direct-to-Consumer and Digital Enterprises.

On September 17, 2019, it was announced that the service would be named "Peacock", as an allusion to the NBC logo. The service announced further details on its initial slate of original programming, including sci-fi series Brave New World (moved from USA Network's slate), limited series Angelyne, crime drama Dr. Death, comedy Rutherford Falls, teen drama One Of Us Is Lying, talk show The Amber Ruffin Show, and reboots and continuations of Battlestar Galactica, Punky Brewster, and Saved by the Bell. It was also announced that library rights to the NBC sitcoms The Office and Parks and Recreation would move exclusively to Peacock in January 2021 and October 2020 respectively.

Peacock soft launched for Comcast Xfinity cable subscribers beginning on April 15, 2020, beginning with X1 and Xfinity Flex customers. The service then launched nationally on July 15, 2020.

As of August 2021, the service had reached at least 54 million signups. In April 2022, the service reached 28 million monthly active accounts and 13 million paid subscribers, an increase of 40% from the previous quarter. It also reported a 25% increase in engagement year-over-year. In September 2022, the service had 30 million monthly active accounts and 15 million paid subscribers, a 70% increase in paid subscribers since the start of 2022. As of December 2022, the service has reached 20 million paid subscribers, with its coverage of the 2022 FIFA World Cup in Spanish having been credited with an increase in the fourth quarter of 2022.

Distribution
Peacock has three tiers of service: Free, Premium, and Premium Plus. The Premium tier is a subscription-based service which includes Peacock's full library of content, while the Free tier contains a subset of its content. The Free and Premium tiers are advertising-supported, with commercials limited to five minutes per hour. Peacock Premium is included in some services from television service providers, such as Cox which ended January 15, 2023 and Xfinity. Subscribers to Peacock Premium, whether subscribing directly or receiving service through a provider, can upgrade to the ad-free Premium Plus tier for an additional monthly cost. In January 2023, NBCUniversal discontinued the Free tier for new users: only subscription-based plans are available, with the Free plan only available to existing users, and those whose Premium subscription has lapsed.

On May 6, 2020, a distribution deal with Apple made Peacock available on iOS devices and Apple TV on-launch. Peacock content is also available within the Apple TV app, and the Premium service is available as an in-app subscription. On July 20, 2020, Peacock launched an app for PlayStation 4. On September 21, 2020, Peacock became available on Roku. The company's September 18 agreement for the service narrowly averted a blackout of NBCUniversal's TV Everywhere apps on Roku devices, due to a dispute over revenue sharing and advertising inventory assignment. On June 8, 2021, Peacock launched an app for Samsung smart TVs. On June 24, 2021, Peacock launched an app for Amazon Fire TV and Amazon Fire tablets, such as Fire HD.

Content
The service is drawn primarily from the NBCUniversal library, including subsidiaries such as Universal Pictures and Universal Television. It is said to include at least 15,000 hours of content on-launch without a subscription, and an additional 5,000 hours of content for Premium subscribers. Current episodes of NBC series are available on Peacock the day after their premiere for Premium subscribers; non-subscribers will receive them on a week's delay.

Peacock also offers a lineup of around 25 curated digital linear channels, including long-form and digital-originated programming content from NBCUniversal's broadcast and cable properties (such as Today All Day, a digital extension of NBC's morning show Today), as well as third-party content providers. They are designed to emulate a traditional broadcast programming experience (similar to services such as Pluto TV and Xumo, the latter of which was purchased by NBCUniversal parent Comcast in February 2020).

On January 26, 2020, NBC announced plans to stream The Tonight Show Starring Jimmy Fallon and Late Night with Seth Meyers at 8:00 and 9:00 p.m. ET, respectively, ahead of their television premieres on NBC. The decision, however, was criticized by many of NBC's affiliate groups out of concern that the "pre-airs" of both late-night talk shows on Peacock would cannibalize viewership for the shows on local NBC stations, and never came to fruition.

On July 6, 2021, Universal announced that they would not be renewing their pay-one output deal with HBO, in favor of bringing their films to Peacock during the pay-one window beginning in 2022. All films will exclusively be available on Peacock during the first and last four months of the 18-month pay-one window (with Universal licensing their live-action films to Amazon Prime Video and licensing their animated films from Illumination and DreamWorks Animation to Netflix in-between those two exclusivity windows). The pay-one window for Universal films was initially brought forward to four months after a film's initial theatrical release with this move, but it was later announced on December 9, 2021, that the pay-one window would be brought forward to as little as 45 days after a film's initial theatrical release (though Universal's deals with theater chains regarding the premium video on demand window for these films would be unaffected by this move).

In January 2022, NBC's Spanish-language sister network Telemundo announced TPlus, a new "content hub" for Spanish-language programming on Peacock Premium that will launch later in the same year to coincide with the FIFA World Cup.

In May 2022, Universal Pictures announced that it would shift three of its films to Peacock in 2023: Shooting Stars, a biographical feature about LeBron James based on his memoir; Praise This, about a youth choir music competition; and a remake of John Woo's 1989 crime drama The Killer.

In August 2022, NBC announced that its long-running soap opera Days of Our Lives would move exclusively to Peacock Premium beginning September 12 of that same year, after a 57-year run on the network. The miniseries spin-off Days of Our Lives: Beyond Salem had previously premiered as a Peacock original series. It also announced that next-day streaming of Bravo programs would move to Peacock for the upcoming television season, as NBCUniversal had invoked its option to end an agreement with Hulu for next-day streaming rights for NBC and Bravo programming.

On November 30, 2022, live streaming of local NBC stations was added for Premium Plus subscribers. This function was available at launch in 210 markets.

Original programming

Third-party content
Lionsgate licenses library content for Peacock, as part of a larger agreement by Comcast to renew its carriage of Starz. In turn, NBCUniversal will license content for StarzPlay in the U.S. and internationally. On January 16, 2020, Peacock acquired the streaming rights to the Warner Bros. Television series Two and a Half Men and George Lopez, the Paramount Network series Yellowstone, as well as The Matrix films. In February 2020, A&E Networks licensed some titles from the A&E and History libraries to Peacock. Peacock also had rights to the Harry Potter film series as part of an existing deal with NBCUniversal networks from October 2020 until August 2021, before WarnerMedia (now Warner Bros. Discovery) took them back on September 1 of that same year, for HBO Max after an adjustment in the agreement.

On July 1, 2020, ViacomCBS (now Paramount Global) non-exclusively licensed some of its television series and films to Peacock, such as Everybody Hates Chris, Ray Donovan, and Undercover Boss among others. The service will also hold rights to several Paramount Pictures films under a limited exclusivity window from 2021 to 2023.

On July 14, 2020, the service acquired the Canadian drama Departure for a U.S. premiere.

On July 17, 2020, Cinedigm licensed over a dozen films and three streaming channels for Peacock's launch, with hundreds of other films and television episodes to follow.

In January 2021, Peacock added Claudia Rosencrantz and Adrian Woolfe's streaming entertainment news channel LIT, with the platform serving as its U.S. launch partner for an exclusivity period.

On May 18, 2021, NBCUniversal announced that it had acquired the U.S. streaming rights to the Eurovision Song Contest for Peacock under a two-year deal, beginning with the 2021 edition (whose first semi-final heat was held later that day). The agreement came shortly after NBC reached an agreement with the EBU to produce an U.S. music competition series patterned off Eurovision. For 2022, NBC's lead figure skating analyst Johnny Weir was added as a host for its broadcast.

On June 10, 2021, Peacock added content from anime streaming service RetroCrush.

On October 31, 2022, NBCUniversal announced an SVOD agreement with Hallmark Media, under which Peacock Premium would add a hub featuring content from Hallmark Channel, Hallmark Movies & Mysteries and Hallmark Drama. The agreement includes both on-demand content from Hallmark's library of original series and made-for-TV movies, and the live, linear feeds of all three networks. A similar agreement with Reelz (including true crime programming such as On Patrol: Live) was announced on February 28, 2023; due to conflicts with Peacock's exclusivity agreement with WWE, the linear Reelz channel will be blacked out on Peacock when it carries MLW Underground Wrestling.

WWE content

On January 25, 2021, NBCUniversal, which already televised WWE's professional wrestling weekly programs Raw and NXT on the USA Network, acquired the exclusive U.S. distribution rights to the WWE Network streaming service beginning March 18, 2021. WWE content is carried within a branded channel on Peacock, which includes a selection of WWE content on Peacock's free tier, and the full library for Peacock Premium subscribers, including WWE Network original programming, archive content, and all premium live events (pay-per-views) live and on-demand. Some WWE content on Peacock has been edited to meet NBCUniversal standards and practices, particularly to remove content considered inappropriate under current standards. The standalone WWE Network service for existing U.S. subscribers was shut down on April 4, 2021.

WWE committed to produce a "signature documentary" for the service annually beginning in 2022. In May 2021, Peacock announced that it had ordered WWE Evil, a documentary series created, produced, and narrated by John Cena that chronicles WWE's most prominent antagonists. In December 2022, Peacock announced a documentary on Ric Flair,  Wooooo! Becoming Ric Flair.

Sports programming
Peacock has carried NBC Sports and Telemundo Deportes programming, including live events either in simulcast with NBC or Telemundo, or exclusive to the service. Many of the standalone subscription services offered under the NBC Sports Gold banner were merged into Peacock Premium shortly after its launch, including Premier League Pass, IndyCar Pass, Figure Skating Pass, Rugby Pass, Snow Pass, motocross, and speed skating.

In August 2020, Peacock launched "NBC Sports on Peacock", a content hub featuring sports talk shows and radio simulcasts such as PFT Live with Mike Florio, The Dan Patrick Show, The Rich Eisen Show. In September 2020, NBC Sports on Peacock added Brother From Another, a sports and pop culture-themed show co-hosted by former ESPN reporter Michael Smith and sports writer Michael Holley. In the 2021 NFL season, the channel added an NFL studio show, Sunday Night Football Final, hosted by Kathryn Tappen and Chris Simms. Fantasy Football Happy Hour and Fantasy Football Pregame with Matthew Berry premiered for September 2022.

Notable sporting events carried or simulcast by Peacock include:

 Olympic Games: During the 2020 Summer Olympics, Peacock carried coverage of selected events, as well as a "Tokyo Now" channel featuring exclusive studio programs. At the 2022 Winter Olympics, all events were streamed live on Peacock Premium.
 National Football League: All Sunday Night Football and playoff games in simulcast with NBC beginning in the 2021 season. Peacock will carry one exclusive game per-season beginning in 2023 and add a hub featuring NFL Films library content.
 Major League Baseball: MLB Sunday Leadoff—exclusive national midday games on Sunday afternoons for Peacock Premium subscribers beginning in the 2022 season.
 Soccer:
 Premier League: 175 Premier League matches not on linear television per-season, all matches available on-demand.
 FIFA World Cup: Simulcasts all matches in Spanish from Telemundo and Universo beginning in 2022 (English-language rights are held by Fox Sports).
 United States Soccer Federation: Simulcasts all matches in Spanish from Telemundo and Universo beginning in 2023, such as United States men's and women's national team home matches and the U.S. Open Cup (English-language rights are held by Warner Bros. Discovery Sports).
 College football:
 Notre Dame football: Simulcasts all NBC games beginning in 2021. May also carry exclusive broadcasts, as it did for the team's opener that season.
 Big Ten Conference: Will simulcast NBC's Big Ten Saturday Night games beginning in the 2023 season, and carry eight exclusive games per-season.
 College basketball:
 Big Ten Conference: Will exclusively air 47 men's basketball games and 30 women's basketball games beginning in the 2023–24 season, and the opening night doubleheaders of the Big Ten's men's and women's basketball tournaments.
 IndyCar Series: Coverage of practice sessions, qualifying sessions, and Indy Lights series events beginning in 2021.
 United States Football League (2022): Simulcasts all games televised by NBC and USA Network. In future seasons, four exclusive games will stream on Peacock per-season.
 Collegiate Olympic sports
 Big Ten Conference: 40 telecasts of Olympic sports per-season beginning in the 2023–24 season.

News programming
NBC News's digital streaming channel NBC News Now, and Sky News—a British news channel owned by Comcast subsidiary Sky Group, are carried on Peacock's free tier. NBC News and Sky News had also planned to collaborate on an international news channel for Peacock known as NBC Sky World News, but the proposed service was scrapped in August 2020.

In October 2020 during the leadup to the 2020 presidential election, NBC News launched a new channel on Peacock known as The Choice, which airs original news and opinion programs. At launch, these included The Majority Report with Sam Seder, The Mehdi Hasan Show, and Zerlina. In July 2021, the channel was rebranded as "The Choice by MSNBC". In 2022, The Choice was folded into a new MSNBC hub, featuring original content and on-demand streaming of selected MSNBC programs.

In January 2021, Peacock premiered The Overview, a new weekly series hosted by Gadi Schwartz that features conversational discussions on news topics and "paradigm shifts" impacting the world.

In January 2022, Peacock launched 24/7 streaming local news channels from the NBC Owned Television Stations division, the channels features simulcast and encore news programming, along with breaking news and original content produced by its NBC station's local news operations. The 4 markets launching the streaming local news channels on January 20, with stations in Chicago (WMAQ-TV, as NBC Chicago News), Miami (WTVJ, as NBC Miami News), Philadelphia (WCAU, as NBC Philadelphia News) and Boston (NBC 10 Boston/NECN, as NBC Boston News) as launch cities, followed by two other cities including New York City (WNBC, as NBC New York News) and Los Angeles (KNBC, as NBC LA News) on March 17, 2022. NBCLX launched in 2022 shortly after the local news channels.

International syndication and versions
In June 2020, Canadian broadcaster Corus Entertainment acquired exclusive English Canadian broadcast rights to Peacock Original programming. In October 2021, Quebecor Content acquired exclusive French Canadian rights to Peacock Original programming for its streaming service, Club Illico.

In December 2021, OSN acquired Peacock's original programming with the Middle Eastern streaming service, OSN+.

In August 2020, NBCUniversal signed a distribution deal with Australian streaming service Stan, including Peacock's original programming until 2022.

On July 29, 2021, Comcast and Sky announced that Peacock would be launching in Austria, Germany, Ireland, Italy, Switzerland and the United Kingdom in Q4 2021 and would be available to all Sky Q, Sky Glass, and Now/Wow (in Germany, Ireland, Italy, and the United Kingdom) customers at no extra cost from its launch. Peacock was given a soft launch in the UK and Ireland on November 16, 2021, to all Sky and Now subscribers. On January 25, 2022, Peacock further expanded in Sky territories, soft launching in Austria and Germany, followed by Italy on February 15, 2022, and Switzerland on March 2, 2022.

On August 18, 2021, Comcast announced an agreement with Paramount Global (then-known as ViacomCBS) to launch SkyShowtime, a joint streaming service combining programming from both companies, including Peacock Originals, which will be based on Peacock's infrastructure. The service is expected to be available in 20 smaller European territories, including four Nordic countries along with Hungary and Poland where it will replace Paramount Global's Paramount+ (Nordic countries) or its eponymous SVOD service (Hungary and Poland, where it was known as Paramount Play), instead of Peacock and Paramount+ operating separately in those markets. SkyShowtime was released on September 20, 2022, in the Nordics, launched in October 25 of same year, in the Netherlands and Portugal, launched in the former Yugoslav countries (except North Macedonia) on December 14 of that same year and in the rest of Central and Eastern Europe on February 14, 2023. SkyShowtime finished its expansion by releasing in Spain and Andorra on February 28, 2023.

At the same time, Bloomberg News reported that Comcast was working towards launching Peacock in several other territories, including Latin America, Australia, Asia, and France.

If you try to access Peacock outside the US i.e. Australia or Canada, you may encounter a geo-blocked error message. This is because Peacock uses your device's IP address to determine your location, and if it detects that you are outside the USA, it will block your access to the streaming service.

There are ways to bypass this restriction, such as using a VPN (Virtual Private Network) service that can make it appear as though you are accessing Peacock from within the United States.

See also
 Hayu
 Hulu
 Vudu
 Seeso
 List of streaming media services

Notes

References

External links

 

NBCUniversal
Internet television streaming services
Subscription video streaming services
Internet properties established in 2020
Internet television channels
WWE Network
PlayStation 4 software
PlayStation 5 software
IOS software
Android (operating system) software